The FIBA Oceania Championship for Men 1999 was the qualifying tournament of FIBA Oceania for the 2000 Summer Olympics. Australia did not enter this tournament because they took the host spot of the Olympic tournament. The tournament was a one-game playoff between Guam and New Zealand, held in Auckland. New Zealand won and qualified for the 2000 Summer Olympics.

Teams that did not enter

Results

External links
FIBA Archive

FIBA Oceania Championship
Championship
1999 in New Zealand basketball
1999 in Guamanian sports
International basketball competitions hosted by New Zealand
New Zealand men's national basketball team games